Platyptilia is a genus of moths in the family Pterophoridae. The genus was described by Jacob Hübner in 1825.

Species

Platyptilia aarviki Gielis, 2008
Platyptilia ainonis Matsumura, 1931
Platyptilia albicans (Fish, 1881)
Platyptilia albifimbriata Arenberger, 2002
Platyptilia anniei Gielis, 1997
Platyptilia archimedon Meyrick, 1938
Platyptilia ardua McDunnough, 1927
Platyptilia barbarae Ustjuzhanin & Kovtunovich, 2010
Platyptilia benitensis Strand, 1913
Platyptilia bowkeri Kovtunovich & Ustjuzhanin, 2011
Platyptilia cacaliae
Platyptilia calamicola
Platyptilia calodactyla (Denis & Schiffermüller, 1775)
Platyptilia campsiptera Meyrick, 1907
Platyptilia carduidactyla (Riley, 1869)
Platyptilia celidotus (Meyrick, 1885)
Platyptilia censoria Meyrick, 1910
Platyptilia charadrias (Meyrick, 1884)
Platyptilia chondrodactyla
Platyptilia chosokeiella
Platyptilia citropleura Meyrick, 1907
Platyptilia comorensis Gibeaux, 1994
Platyptilia comstocki Lange, 1939
Platyptilia cretalis Meyrick, 1908
Platyptilia daemonica Meyrick, 1932
Platyptilia davisi Gielis, 1991
Platyptilia dschambiya Arenberger, 1999
Platyptilia duneraensis Rose and Pooni, 2003
Platyptilia eberti Gielis, 2003
Platyptilia enargota Durrant, 1915
Platyptilia euridactyla
Platyptilia exaltatus
Platyptilia farfarellus Zeller, 1867
Platyptilia fulva Bigot, 1964
Platyptilia gandaki Gielis, 1999
Platyptilia gentiliae Gielis, 1991
Platyptilia gondarensis Gibeaux, 1994
Platyptilia gonodactyla (Denis & Schiffermüller, 1775)
Platyptilia gravior Meyrick, 1932
Platyptilia grisea Gibeaux, 1994
Platyptilia hokowhitalis Hudson, 1939
Platyptilia humida Meyrick, 1920
Platyptilia iberica Rebel, 1935
Platyptilia ignifera Meyrick, 1908
Platyptilia implacata Meyrick, 1932
Platyptilia interpres Meyrick, 1922
Platyptilia isocrates
Platyptilia isodactylus (Zeller, 1852)
Platyptilia isoterma Meyrick, 1909
Platyptilia johnstoni Lange, 1940
Platyptilia kozanica Fazekas, 2003
Platyptilia locharcha Meyrick, 1924
Platyptilia longalis (Walker, 1864)
Platyptilia longiloba
Platyptilia lusi
Platyptilia melitroctis Meyrick, 1924
Platyptilia microbscura Gielis & De Vos, 2007
Platyptilia molopias Meyrick, 1906
Platyptilia montana Yano, 1963
Platyptilia morophaea Meyrick, 1920
Platyptilia naminga
Platyptilia nemoralis Zeller, 1841
Platyptilia nussi Gielis, 2003
Platyptilia odiosa Meyrick, 1924
Platyptilia omissalis T. B. Fletcher, 1926
Platyptilia onias Meyrick, 1916
Platyptilia pauliani Gibeaux, 1994
Platyptilia percnodactylus (Walsingham, 1880)
Platyptilia phanerozona Diakonoff, 1952
Platyptilia peyrierasi Gibeaux, 1994
Platyptilia picta Meyrick, 1913
Platyptilia postbarbata Meyrick, 1938
Platyptilia profunda Yano, 1963
Platyptilia pseudofulva Gibeaux, 1994
Platyptilia pulverulenta Philpott, 1923
Platyptilia pygmaeana Strand, 1913
Platyptilia resoluta
Platyptilia rhyncholoba Meyrick, 1924
Platyptilia romieuxi Gielis, 2009
Platyptilia rubriacuta Gielis, 2009
Platyptilia sabius (Felder & Rogenhofer, 1875)
Platyptilia sciophaea Meyrick, 1920
Platyptilia sedata Meyrick, 1932
Platyptilia semnopis Meyrick, 1931
Platyptilia sochivkoi Kovtunovich & Ustjuzhanin, 2011
Platyptilia sogai Gibeaux, 1994
Platyptilia spicula Gielis, 2006
Platyptilia strictiformis Meyrick, 1932
Platyptilia suigensis
Platyptilia superscandens
Platyptilia tesseradactyla (Linnaeus, 1761)
Platyptilia thiosoma Meyrick, 1920
Platyptilia thyellopa Meyrick, 1926
Platyptilia toxochorda Meyrick, 1934
Platyptilia triphracta
Platyptilia ussuriensis
Platyptilia vilema B. Landry, 1993
Platyptilia vinsoni Gibeaux, 1994
Platyptilia violacea Gibeaux, 1994
Platyptilia washburnensis McDunnough, 1929
Platyptilia williamsii Grinnell, 1908

Species brought into synonymy
Platyptilia amphiloga Meyrick, 1909: synonym of Lantanophaga pusillidactyla (Walker, 1864)
Platyptilia claripicta T. B. Fletcher, 1910: synonym of Platyptilia farfarellus Zeller, 1867
Platyptilia corniculata: synonym of Marasmarcha corniculata (Meyrick, 1913)
Platyptilia dimorpha: synonym of Bipunctiphorus dimorpha (T. B. Fletcher, 1910)
Platyptilia emissalis: synonym of Sinpunctiptilia emissalis (Walker, 1864)
Platyptilia empedota: synonym of Marasmarcha empedota (Meyrick, 1908)
Platyptilia euctimena: synonym of Bipunctiphorus euctimena (Turner, 1913)
Platyptilia infesta: synonym of Inferuncus infesta (Meyrick, 1934)
Platyptilia maligna Meyrick, 1913: synonym of Vietteilus vigens (Felder & Rogenhofer, 1875)
Platyptilia patriarcha Meyrick, 1912: synonym of Bipunctiphorus dimorpha (T. B. Fletcher, 1910)
Platyptilia periacta Meyrick, 1910: synonym of Platyptilia farfarellus Zeller, 1867
Platyptilia stenoptiloides: synonym of Gillmeria stenoptiloides (Filipjev, 1927)

References

External links

 

 
Taxa named by Jacob Hübner
Moth genera